Vonnas is a commune in the Ain department in eastern France.

Vonnas has a famous restaurant with three stars in the Guide Michelin, the Hotel Restaurant Georges Blanc.

Geography
The Veyle forms part of the commune's northeastern border, flows west through the northern part of the commune, then forms part of its northwestern border. Vonnas station has rail connections to Bourg-en-Bresse, Ambérieu-en-Bugey and Mâcon.

Population

See also
Communes of the Ain department

References

External links

 Dombes and Vonnas
 Georges Blanc's restaurant

Communes of Ain
Ain communes articles needing translation from French Wikipedia
Bresse